Friedrich Mücke (born 12 March 1981) is a German actor  who has appeared in more than twenty films since 2006, many of which have tackled issues relating to the former GDR (the Communist state that was commonly known as East Germany).

Selected filmography

References

External links 

1981 births
Living people
German male film actors